Mia Kardia (Greek: A Heart; English: Μια Καρδιά) is the second EP by Greek artist, Katy Garbi. It was released on 14 November 2002 by Sony Music Greece and received double-platinum certification, selling over 50,000 units*, making it Katy's most successful EP to date. It contains five tracks, including a duet with Giorgos Tsalikis.

In 2002, double-platinum was the EP whose sales exceeded 40,000 units.

Track listing

Singles
The following singles were officially released to radio stations with music videos, except the songs "Ante Geia" and "Mia Kardia Tin Eho".

"Ante Geia"

"Ante Geia" was the lead single and released on 11 November 2002. It was initially released as an exclusive on Sfera FM radio and soon gained massive airplay on radio stations nationwide.

"Mia Kardia Tin Eho"

"Mia Kardia Tin Eho" was the second single and released on 20 January 2003 gaining a substantial amount of airplay and also being featured in many compilation albums.

"Tha Meinei Metaxi Mas"

"Tha Meinei Metaxi Mas" was the third single and release on 20 March 2003 with music video, directed by Manolis Tzirakis. The video clip was exclusively released on MAD TV and was a huge success. Katy performed all of the EP's singles on Fame Story 1, including "Tha Meinei Metaxi Mas" in a duet with contestant Thanos Petrelis.

"M' Eheis Arrostisei"

"M' Eheis Arrostisei" was the fourth and last single and released on 29 May 2003 with music video, directed by Giorgos Gkavalos. The video clip was exclusively released on MAD TV and marking a success airplay after the last hits.

Credits 
Credits adapted from liner notes.

Personnel 

 Giannis Bithikotsis – bouzouki, cura, baglama (tracks: 5)
 Savvas Christodoulou – guitars (tracks: 5)
 Christos Dantis – orchestration, programming, keyboards, backing vocals (tracks: 2)
 Anna Ioannidou – backing vocals (tracks: 3)
 Telis Kafkas – bass (tracks: 5)
 Katerina Kiriakou – backing vocals (tracks: 1, 4)
 Giannis Lionakis – guitars (tracks: 5)
 Kostas Miliotakis – orchestration, programming, keyboards (tracks: 1, 4, 5)
 Andreas Mouzakis – drums (tracks: 5)
 Arsenis Nasis – percussion (tracks: 1, 4)
 Ilias Pantazopoulos – orchestration, programming, keyboards (tracks: 3)
 Alex Panagi – backing vocals (tracks: 1, 4)

Production 

 Aris Binis (Sofita studio) – sound engineer, mix engineer (tracks: 3)
 Giannis Doulamis – production manager
 Al Giga – styling
 Giannis Ioannidis (Digital Press Hellas) – mastering
 Christos Kosmas (Echo studio) – sound engineer, mix engineer (tracks: 5)
 Lefteris Neromiliotis (Sofita studio) – sound engineer, mix engineer (tracks: 1, 2, 4)
 Petros Paraschis – art direction
 Roula Revi – photographer
 Petros Siakavellas (Digital Press Hellas) – mastering
 Despina Triantafillidou – cover processing
 Stefanos Vasilakis – hair styling
 Manos Vynichakis – make up

Charts 
Mia Kardia made its debut at number 1 on the 'Greece Top 50 Singles' charts.

In a month, it was certified platinum and later received double-platinum by IFPI.

References 

2002 EPs
Greek-language albums
Katy Garbi EPs